is a 27-minute Japanese anime directed by Akio Watanabe and Toshikazu Matsubara, and produced by CoMix Wave Films as an original net animation. It was made available online on June 21, 2006, and then was released on DVD in Japan on August 3, 2006. It was screened at the Waterloo Festival on November 16, 2006. The OVA was released on DVD along with the Coffee Samurai OVA on May 10, 2011, by Section 23 Films. Anime Network shows both Hoshizora Kiseki and Coffee Samurai.

Plot summary
Kozue loves to stargaze and does so regularly. On a trip to view a meteorite, she happens to meet a boy named Ginga. He has a mysterious ability to discover more information about the stars, which he uses to help scientists with astronomical research. Unfortunately, his life is mostly dictated for him, and when carrying out missions, he must always wear a protective suit. Kozue helps Ginga to gradually take control of his life by encouraging him to make his own decisions.

Characters
Ginga

Kozue

References

External links
 Official Japanese Website

2006 anime OVAs
Drama anime and manga
Science fiction anime and manga
Sentai Filmworks
2006 anime ONAs
CoMix Wave Films films